Mošovce is one of the largest villages in the historical region of Turiec, currently in the Turčianske Teplice District in the Žilina Region of northern Slovakia.

History
Many preserved historical buildings are the evidence of the 770 years of its existence. It was mentioned for the first time in 1233 in the deed of donation by King Andrew II. 
Originally, Mošovce was made up of two settlements: The first one, Machyuch, was located in the area of today’s Starý Rad, and the second one, Terra Moys, which gave the village its current name, occupied the place of the present day Vidrmoch. And it is the name of the second settlement meaning The Land of Mojš, which makes us believe that the whole village once belonged to certain Mr. Mojš, whose name might have been an abbreviation of a compound Slavic name Mojtech, similar to the names Vojtech or Mojmír. Throughout history the name of the village has undergone many variations ranging from Mossovych, Mosocz, Mossowecz, villa regia Mayos alio nomine Mossovych, oppidioum Mayus sue Mosocz, Mosocz olim Mayus to the present-day Mošovce.
The name of a separate ancient part of Mošovce, a former settlement Chornukov, has been preserved in the modern form of Čerňakov. Yet another part of the village bears the name of Mazan.

Mošovce first developed as a royal settlement with a free advocacy, and from the middle the 14th century as a privileged town subjected to the royal castle of Blatnica. In 1527 it fell into the hands of the Révay family, who suppressed the town privileges of Mošovce for almost 400 years.

In the past, Mošovce was an important craft center of the Turiec region. Crafts experienced a surprising expansion, and there were around 15 guilds active in the town; the bootmaker and the most famous furrier guild were the ones to survive for the longest time. The present-day Mošovce can be characterized as an important tourist area with many sights.

Geography
The surroundings of Mošovce are truly unique. A complex of historic tree avenues and groves creates an aesthetic and impressive landscape, which works as an extension to the woodland scenery of the Veľká Fatra Mountains with its peaks of Tlstá, Ostrá and Drienok. This mountain range belongs to the most attractive ones in Slovakia. Limestone and dolomite rock formations of fantastic shapes, as well as the beautiful nature in the nearby Blatnická and Gaderská Valleys attract people from all parts of the world.

A stream called Mošovka flows through Mošovce, and is divided into two distributaries: the main stream, and the so-called Upper Stream, which was in the past used to propel the mill.

The northern part of the town, next to its part Čerňakov, hosts a system of ponds fed by the Čierna Voda stream. Originally the ponds belonged to the Révay manor, while today they are used predominantly for breeding trout.

Sights
One of the most remarkable monuments is a Rococo-Classical Manor House from the 2nd half of the 18th century with an extensive English park. Other sites in the town include: The birthplace of Ján Kollár, a Neo-Gothic Catholic church with a valuable altar built on the spot of its ancient predecessor, a Lutheran church built in 1784, a Mausoleum now hosting the Museum of Crafts, an Art-Nouveau greenhouse, and a garden pavilion from 1800.

Demographics
According to the 2001 census, the municipality had 1,380 inhabitants, confirming a slight 4,7% decrease of the town population in the last 7 years. 98.62% of inhabitants were Slovaks, 0.72% Czechs and 0.14% Hungarian. The religious make-up was 54.78% Lutherans, 30.36% Roman Catholics and 12.97% people with no religious affiliation.

Notable residents
Mošovce has produced several notable personalities, including Frico Kafenda (1883–1963), composer and pedagogue; Anna Lacková-Zora (1899–1988), writer; Štefan Krčméry (1892–1955), literary critic, historian, and poet; Jur Tesák Mošovský, Baroque playwright, church dignitary, and a religious writer, whose works belong to the period of Humanism; and Miloslav Schmidt, the founder of the amateur fire brigades in Slovakia or a successful footballer Alexander Horváth.

However, the most well known person born in Mošovce is likely the Slavic poet, philosopher, and Lutheran preacher, Ján Kollár (1793–1852), who greatly influenced the literature of at least two nations with his poetic composition Slávy Dcera. His work is often cited as the basis and motive for contemporary patriots and national activists. It has been translated into various Slavic, as well as non-Slavic languages.

In addition to that, the following personalities were born or lived in Mošovce:
 Izák Abrahamides - author and religious activist
 Dušan Čajka - doctor
 Ján Emanuel Dobrucký - Sorbian national activist, poet
 Rudolf Fraštacký - businessman, politician, vice-president of the Board of Commissioners and a member of the anti-nazi resistance
 Dušan Jamriška - military officer
 Daniel Krman - author and translator
 Daniel Láni - church author
 Eliáš Láni - poet and author
 Gregor Láni - Lutheran dignitary and author
 Viliam Lenčo - pedagogue
 Karol Lilge - national activist and author
 Matej Lochman - priest and chronicler
 Matej Miškóci - national activist and pedagogue
 Matej Polereczky - military officer
 Ján Sturmayr - architect
 Ján Šikura - historian
 Ondrej Šoltýs - encyclopedian
 Samuel Štarke - national activist
 Jozef Tatár - author and teacher
 Ladislav Zgúth - national activist and journalist

Daily life

The village hosts the Associated School of Farming and Fishery, which belongs to only a few of its kind in Central Europe. As for annual events, the traditional Michael's Mošovce Fair, which takes place in early October, is one of the largest fairs in Slovakia. In addition to the New Year's fireworks and a classical Maypole celebrations, another event worth mentioning is a Fire Brigade ball organized during the Carnival period and connected to a Mask March. In the past, until the beginning of the 1990s, a half-marathon with the name of The SNP Run was held in the town annually. In addition to that, at the end of August Mošovce becomes the site of the ŠRZ Drienok Cup Volleyball tournament - the largest amateur volleyball tournament in Slovakia, founded in 1977, with the participation of around 90 teams. At the same time, a solemn wreath-laying takes place under the Slovak National Uprising monument.

Town economy 
Until the beginning of the 1990s the town had a hide-processing factory together with the connecting fur-processing industry. Later the inhabitants changed focus to provision of tourist services (local thermal springs and nature are used), food industry (baking facilities), construction field (production of concrete prefabricates, house kits, as well as traditional construction industry) and fishery (Mošovce ponds). Agriculture still keeps its importance, with an increasing significance of forestry.

It is, however, necessary to emphasize, that the town's function is still predominantly residential and the majority of economically active inhabitants commute to the nearby Turčianske Teplice or Martin.

Twin towns
Mošovce is twinned with:
 Dwikozy, Poland
 Kozy, Poland
 Lalić (Odžaci), Serbia

Gallery

See also

 Révay
 Manor House in Mošovce
 Mošovce Park
 Church of Holy Trinity in Mošovce
 Lutheran Church in Mošovce
 Neogothic chapel in Mošovce

External links
Official site 
Tourist Brochure
Information about Mošovce
Drienok

References

BEŇOVSKÝ, J. a kol.: Mošovce v premenách času. Martin: Osveta, 1984. 304 pp.
LIPPAN, M. a kol.: Mošovce. Banská Bystrica: Stredoslovenské vydavateľstvo, 1971. 405 pp.
REŤKOVSKÝ, P.: The Tourist Guide of Sites in Mošovce. Mošovce: Obecný úrad Mošovce, 2004. 38 pp., 
TATÁR, J.: Mošovce v historickej, kultúrnej a prírodnej mozaike. Mošovce: Obecný úrad Mošovce, 2003. 124 pp., 
TATÁR, J.: Živý poklad (Povesti z Mošoviec). Mošovce: Obecný úrad Mošovce, 1994. 64 pp. 

 
Villages and municipalities in Turčianske Teplice District